The Australian Aboriginal Astronomy Project is a collaboration of academics, educators, and Indigenous elders researching the astronomical traditions and knowledge of Indigenous Australians, commonly termed Australian Aboriginal astronomy.  This research in cultural astronomy covers the disciplines of archaeoastronomy, ethnoastronomy, historical astronomy, geomythology, and Indigenous knowledge.

In 2021, asteroid 10040 Ghillar was named in honour of Ghillar Michael Anderson, an elder of the Euahlayi people, who has collaborated with academic astronomers Robert Fuller and Duane Hamacher in sharing and documenting traditional star knowledge of the Kamilaroi and Euahlayi people.

References

External links
 Australian Indigenous Astronomy

Archaeology of Australia
Archaeoastronomy
Australian Aboriginal culture